MIKE 21C is a computer program that simulates the development in the river bed and channel plan form in two dimensions. MIKE 21C was developed by DHI. MIKE 21C uses curvilinear finite difference grids.

Simulated processes with MIKE 21C include bank erosion, scouring and shoaling brought about by activities such as construction and dredging, seasonal fluctuations in flow, etc.

Applications
MIKE 21C can be used for designing protection schemes against bank erosion, evaluating measures to reduce or manage shoaling, analyzing alignments and dimensions of navigation channels for minimizing capital and maintenance dredging, predicting the impact of bridge, tunnel and pipeline crossings on river channel hydraulics and morphology, optimizing restoration plans for habitat environment in channel floodplain systems, designing monitoring networks based on morphological forecasting.

Due to its accurate descriptions of the physical processes, MIKE 21C can simulate a braided river developing from a plane bed, which was illustrated by Enggrob & Tjerry (1998).

Theory
As most other models made by DHI, MIKE 21C applies an add-on concept in which the overall time-loop can contain processes to be simulated, selected by the user. In its basic form the model is a 2-dimensional hydrodynamic model that can simulate dynamic as well as quasi-steady or steady-state hydrodynamic solutions. The hydrodynamic model solves the Saint-Venant equations in two dimensions with the water depth defined in cell centers and a staggered velocity field (internally the code solves the flux field, i.e. the water depth multiplied by the velocity vector) defined with direction as the local grid base vector.

The model is computationally a parallel code (written in Fortran) with parallelizations in all modules, which allows for simulations of morphological developments on fine grids over long periods of time. The model is typically applied with as much 25,000 computational points over periods of several years or even decades.

The most important secondary flow in rivers is the so-called helical flow, with its name derived from Helios (the Sun in Greek). The name helical is used because the flow arises as the water in the lower portions of the water column flowing towards the local center of curvature, and away from the local center of curvature along the water surface. This has only a minor impact on the hydrodynamics, usually only pronounced on a laboratory scale, but it has profound impacts on the sediment transport and morphology because the helical flow influences the otherwise zero transverse sediment component. MIKE 21C applies standard theory for the helical flow, which can be found in e.g. Rozowsky (1957). Standard helical flow theory provides a secondary flow velocity profile that is fully characterised by friction and the deviation angle between the main flow direction and the direction of the shear stress at the river bed.

MIKE 21C uses the traditional division of sediment transport into bedload and suspended load, and the model can simulate both non-cohesive and cohesive sediment in a mixture.

The bed-load model accounts for the impacts of secondary flow (bed shear stress direction) and local bed slope (gravity). Suspended load is calculated with an advection-dispersion equation for each fraction, which includes adaptation in time and space as well as the 2-dimensional depth-integrated effects of the 3-dimensional flow pattern through profile functions (Galappatti & Vreugdenhil, 1985).

Citations
 I.L. Rozowsky (1957) "Flow of Water in bends of open channels", English Translation, Israel Progr. For Scientific Transl., Jerusalem
 R. Galappatti and C.B. Vreugdenhil (1985) "A depth-integrated model for suspended transport",Journal of Hydraulic Research, Vol.23, No.4
 H.G. Enggrob and S. Tjerry (1998) "Simulation of Morphological Characteristics of a Braided River", Proc IAHR-Symp on River, Coastal and Estuarine morphodynamics, University of Genova, Dept Environmental Eng., Genova, 585–594.

Integrated hydrologic modelling
Hydraulic engineering
Environmental engineering
Physical geography